Olga "Olguita" Antonetti Núñez (February 19, 1945 – December 12, 1968) was a Venezuelan beauty pageant titleholder for 1962, and the official representative of Venezuela to the Miss International 1962 pageant held in Long Beach, California, USA, on August 18, 1962, when she classified in the Top 15 semifinalists. Antonetti died in a plane crash on December 12, 1968, at the age of 23.

References

External links
Miss Venezuela Official Website
Miss International Official Website

1945 births
1968 deaths
People from Anzoátegui
Miss Venezuela winners
Victims of aviation accidents or incidents in Venezuela
Venezuelan people of Corsican descent